Zampieri is an Italian surname. Notable people with the surname include:

Caio Zampieri (born 1986), Brazilian tennis player
Daniel Zampieri (born 1990), Italian racing driver
 Domenico Zampieri (1581–1641), known as Domenichino, Italian painter
Gian Luigi Zampieri, Italian conductor
Mara Zampieri (born 1951), Italian opera singer
Steve Zampieri (born 1977), Swiss cyclist

Italian-language surnames